Zabok is a town and situated in northwest Croatia in the Krapina-Zagorje County. According to the 2011 census, it has a total population of 8,994, with 2,714 in Zabok itself. Zabok is situated on the main crossroads in the heart of Hrvatsko Zagorje region. Zabok is the economical centre of the Krapina-Zagorje County.

History
In 1782, Sigismund Vojković-Vojkffy started the construction of a church in Zabok, completing it in 1805. With the abolition of the feudalism, former serfs were offered a possibility of choosing their own place of settlement, and the majority settled along the roads connecting Gredice and Bračak with the new centre developing around the church, to form the new city centre. The town reached its final shape in the period after World War II, when it spread longitudinally along the northern side of the railway track.

Geography
The following settlements comprise the town's administrative area:

 Bračak, population 21
 Bregi Zabočki, population 257
 Dubrava Zabočka, population 591
 Grabrovec, population 607
 Grdenci, population 459
 Gubaševo, population 262
 Hum Zabočki, population 457
 Jakuševec Zabočki, population 364
 Lug Zabočki, population 585
 Martinišće, population 338
 Pavlovec Zabočki, population 605
 Prosenik Gubaševski, population 155
 Prosenik Začretski, population 158
 Repovec, population 312
 Špičkovina, population 764
 Tisanić Jarek, population 345
 Zabok, population 2,714

In the 2011 census, 98% of the population were Croats.

Politics
The town's major Ivan Hanžek (Social Democratic Party of Croatia) was elected a member of the Croatian Parliament in the 2007 parliamentary election.

Etymology and earliest references
"Zabok" means "behind the river curve" (the river in question is the Krapinica). The name Zabok first appeared in 1335 in a text in which ownership of Zabok was given to Petar, son of Nuzlin, by the Hungarian king, Charles I. The Nuzlin family added the prefix de Zabok to their name and, by the 15th century, had started naming themselves "Zaboky de Zabok".

Culture
Zabok is home to monuments to Antun Gustav Matoš and Katarina Zrinska. The soprano Vlatka Oršanić was born in Zabok and received her early music education at the music school there.

Transportation 
Zabok is the central railway hub of Krapina-Zagorje County. It lies on the corridor R201 (Zaprešić-Čakovec) and also serves as a terminus for railway lines to and from Krapina / state border with Slovenia (R106) and Gornja Stubica (L202).

Zabok bus station is served by buses of the company "Presečki d.o.o." which connect the City of Zabok with numerous cities through county and inter-county lines such as Zabok-Zagreb, Zabok-Zlatar, Zabok-Marija Bistrica, Zabok-Krapina, Zabok-Pregrada, Zabok-Hum na Sutli, Zabok-Bedekovčina and Zabok-Oroslavje.

References

External links

Official website of Zabok
Croatian government page on Zabok

Populated places in Krapina-Zagorje County
Cities and towns in Croatia